Acerentulus confinis is a species of proturan in the family Acerentomidae. It is found in Africa, Australia, Europe and Northern Asia (excluding China), and North America.

Subspecies
These two subspecies belong to the species Acerentulus confinis:
 Acerentulus confinis confinis (Berlese, 1908)
 Acerentulus confinis maderensis Tuxen, 1982

References

Further reading

 

Protura
Articles created by Qbugbot
Animals described in 1908